Washington station is an at-grade light rail station on the A Line of the Los Angeles Metro Rail system. The station is located in the center median of Long Beach Avenue (the historic route of the Pacific Electric Railway and shared with the Union Pacific freight railroad's Wilmington Subdivision) at its intersection with Washington Boulevard, in South Los Angeles.

At this station, the A Line changes from the roughly northwest-to-southeast direction down the center of Washington Boulevard to the north–south direction down the center median of Long Beach Avenue.

Service

Station layout

Hours and frequency

Connections 
, the following connections are available:
 Montebello Bus Lines: 50

Notable places nearby 
The station is within walking distance of the following notable places:
Jefferson High School

References

A Line (Los Angeles Metro) stations
1990 establishments in California
Railway stations in the United States opened in 1990